Vacations are an indie rock band from Newcastle, New South Wales formed in 2015.

History
The band was founded by lead singer Campbell Burns in 2015, joined by Jake Johnson, Nate Delizzotti and Joseph Van Lier. In 2018, they released their debut studio album Changes. In 2020, they released their third album Forever in Bloom, under Believe Records.

The band gained traction when their 2016 song "Young" from their EP Vibes went viral on TikTok. As of November 2022, the song has over 300 millions streams on Spotify. It was also certified gold in the United States, garnering over 500,000 sales.

Style
The band describes their music as "woozy guitar pop", and primarily plays a mix of indie rock, and indie pop with elements of shoegaze and lo-fi. The band's musical style sounds similar to Mac DeMarco who Campbell Burns said is a very big influence for the band.

Discography

Albums 
Changes (2018)
Forever in Bloom (2020)

EPs 
Days (2015)
Vibes (2016)

Singles 
"Moving Out" (2017)
"Steady" (2018)
"On Your Own" (2019)
"Lavender" (2020)
"Panache" (2020)
"Avalanche" (2020)
"Actors" (2020)

References

External links

YouTube
Instagram

Australian indie rock groups
Australian indie pop groups
New South Wales musical groups
Musical groups established in 2015